Veeam Software is a privately held US-based information technology company owned by Insight Partners that develops backup, disaster recovery and modern data protection software for virtual, cloud-native, SaaS, Kubernetes and physical workloads. The company headquarters is in Columbus, Ohio, United States.

The name "Veeam" came from the phonetic pronunciation of the letters "VM" — virtual machine.

History

Ratmir Timashev and Andrei Baronov co-founded Veeam in 2006. Timashev and Baronov had sold their previous IT management software company, Aelita Software Corporation, to Quest Software in 2004;Dell subsequently acquired Quest Software in 2012. In June 2016, Dell announced the sale of its software division, which included Quest, to Francisco Partners and Elliott Management Corporation.

The first Veeam products, Veeam Monitor and Veeam Reporter, provided virtual-infrastructure monitoring, reporting, analysis and documentation. Later, in 2010, the company combined both products to form Veeam ONE. Veeam gained attention in 2007 with its free VM backup copy product, FastSCP, which became a basis for building Veeam's data-protection software for hardware virtualization.

In 2014, Veeam held its first conference on data protection and availability called "VeeamON," which took place in Las Vegas, Nevada.

In 2016, Veeam appointed Peter C. McKay, prior senior vice president and general manager, Americas with VMware, as president and COO. I n 2017, Peter McKay and Andrei Baronov were promoted to the company's co-CEO roles. In late 2018, Andrei Baronov was promoted to CEO.

On January 9, 2020, Insight Partners announced that they would purchase Veeam in a $5 billion deal and move the company HQ to the US.

On 22 July 2020, It has been reported that Gartner, Inc. has placed Veeam Software in the 2020 Magic Quadrant for Data Center Backup and Recovery Solutions Leaders.

In 2020, Veeam appointed Bill Largent, prior chairman of the board, as CEO and chairman.

In 2021, Veeam appointed Anand Eswaran as CEO and a member of the company’s Board of Directors. The company has a number of international offices, including regional headquarters for EMEA in Paris, France, for the Americas in Columbus, Ohio, for the Middle East in Dubai and for the Asia-Pacific region in Sydney, Australia. The company's largest R&D center is in Prague, Czechia.

Software 
In 2008, with 10 employees, the company released Veeam Backup & Replication, a tool that provided VMware vSphere VMs with incremental backups and image-based replication, with built-in data deduplication and compression. Veeam Backup & Replication started supporting Microsoft Hyper-V in 2012.

In 2015, the company extended its product line with a free backup utility for physical endpoints — Veeam Endpoint Backup FREE; it  supports PCs running 32- and 64-bit versions of Microsoft Windows OS and integrates with Veeam Backup & Replication. In the same year, it released Veeam FastSCP for Microsoft Azure, a tool for copying files between on-premises and Microsoft Azure VMs.

In 2016, it launched Veeam Backup for Microsoft Office 365, for backing up Office 365 Exchange servers, and Veeam Availability Orchestrator, a multi-hypervisor disaster recovery orchestration software with documenting, testing and reporting capabilities.

In 2017, it introduced three new products: Veeam Agent for Microsoft Windows (successor to Endpoint Backup) and Veeam Agent for Linux — for physical workload data protection with various backup/restore scenarios including cloud, and Veeam Availability Console — a free tool for managing Veeam-powered data protection and disaster recovery in distributed infrastructures and enabling BaaS and DRaaS services delivered through service providers.

In 2020, Veeam announced 16 major releases. This includes Veeam Backup & Replication™ v10, Veeam ONE™ v10, Veeam Backup for Nutanix AHV v2, Veeam Service Provider Console v4, Veeam Backup for Microsoft Azure v1, Veeam Availability Orchestrator v3, Veeam Backup for Microsoft Office 365 v5 and Veeam Backup for AWS v3.

Acquisitions
In 2008, the company acquired nworks to further integrate VMware management with Microsoft and Hewlett-Packard enterprise system management platforms.

This resulted in two new products:

 Veeam nworks Management Pack for VMware  to directly integrate VMware management into Microsoft System Center Operations Manager.
 Veeam nworks Smart Plug-In for VMware  to directly integrate VMware management into HP OpenView.

In 2012, both products were renamed to Veeam Management Pack and Veeam Smart Plug-In, omitting the word "nworks."

In 2017, Veeam acquired N2WS, a company providing cloud-native enterprise-grade backup and disaster recovery solutions for Amazon Web Services (AWS). In 2019, Veeam sold N2WS back to its original founders after discussions with the US Government.

In 2020, Veeam acquired Kasten, a market leader in backup and disaster recovery solutions for Kubernetes.

References

External links

 

Privately held companies of Switzerland
Software companies of the United States
Software companies of France
Software companies of Switzerland
Swiss brands
Software companies established in 2006